A color wheel or colour wheel is an illustration of color hues around a circle.

Color wheel or colour wheel may also refer to:

 Color wheel (optics), a device that uses different optics filters within a light beam
 The Color Wheel, a 2011 American film

See also
 Chromatic circle, in music
 Color wheel graphs of complex functions, in complex analysis
 Color triangle, an arrangement of colors within a triangle